First Presbyterian Church of Dailey Ridge, also known as Reformed Presbyterian Church of the Town of Potsdam, is a historic Presbyterian church located at Potsdam in St. Lawrence County, New York. It was built in 1853 and is a modest, two story wood-frame building with a painted clapboard exterior and a simple, gable front, reactangular plan typical of mid 19th century rural churches.  Located adjacent is the church cemetery.

It was listed on the National Register of Historic Places in 2002.

References

Churches on the National Register of Historic Places in New York (state)
Presbyterian churches in New York (state)
Churches completed in 1853
19th-century Presbyterian church buildings in the United States
Churches in St. Lawrence County, New York
National Register of Historic Places in St. Lawrence County, New York